The 2011 Winchester Council election took place on 5 May 2011 to elect members of Winchester City Council in Hampshire, England. One third of the council was up for election. The Conservatives won 11 seats, the Liberal Democrats 6, and Labour and Independents one each.

After the election, the composition of the council was:

 Conservatives: 27
 Liberal Democrats: 27
 Independent: 2
 Labour: 1

Whilst the council remained under no overall control, with the Conservatives and Liberal Democrats both holding 27 seats, the Conservatives gained control of the council. The two independent and one Labour councillors abstained, with the then-Conservative mayor holding the casting vote.

References 

Winchester City Council elections
2011 English local elections
May 2011 events in the United Kingdom
2010s in Hampshire